Jeffrey T. Polzer is an American academic. He is the UPS Foundation Professor at Harvard Business School, and the co-editor of a book. He studies how people collaborate in teams and across organizational networks to accomplish their individual and collective goals.

References

Year of birth missing (living people)
Living people
University of Wisconsin–Stevens Point alumni
Texas Christian University alumni
Northwestern University alumni
Harvard Business School faculty